Dioscorus (also Dioscoros, Dioskoros, or Dioscurus) can refer to:

 Theodore, Philippa, and Companions (including Dioscorus), 3rd-century martyr and saint
 Dioscurus, father of Saint Barbara (3rd century)
 Dioscorus (consul 442), Roman consul in 442
 Pope Dioscorus I of Alexandria, Coptic Pope of Alexandria deposed at Chalcedon for his leadership at the Second Council of Ephesus (444–454)
 Pope Dioscorus II of Alexandria, Coptic Pope of Alexandria (516–517)
 Antipope Dioscorus (died 530), papal legate to Justinian I at Constantinople; later antipope
 Dioscoros, Byzantine governor of Egypt c. 535
 Dioscorus of Aphrodito, poet and lawyer (died after 585)
 Dioscoros, Abuna Dioskoros (Aba Wolde Tensai) Ethiopian Orthodox Archbishop and miracle worker (1919–1997)
 Dioscoros, Abune Dioskoros Eritrean Orthodox Bishop of Seraye, and claimed Patriarch of Eritrea (disputed) (born in 1935)

See also
 Castor and Polydeuces, known as the Dioscuri in Greek mythology

4th-century Christian saints